The 2010 Valencia GP2 Series round was a GP2 Series motor race held on June 26 and June 27, 2010 at the Valencia Street Circuit in Valencia, Spain. It was the fourth round of the 2010 GP2 Series. The race was used to support the 2010 European Grand Prix.

Report

Feature Race
Pastor Maldonado strengthened his championship aspirations after winning a bizarre feature race at Valencia. The Rapax driver got past ART's Jules Bianchi at the start to go into the first corner in second place behind polesitter Sergio Pérez, but a series of accidents behind him eliminated nearly half the field in the first four corners. A safety car was brought out while the mess was cleaned up and just 13 of the 24 cars were still on the track for the restart three laps later, although Ocean's Fabio Leimer and Trident's Adrian Zaugg were also able to rejoin after pitting for repairs. But there was more drama to come before the race returned to green. Maldonado went wide at the final corner and Bianchi, taking advantage of the fact that the safety car line is before the start-finish line, was able to take the Venezuelan by surprise and pass him for second. Bianchi made a successful move on Pérez for the lead not long afterwards, but Davide Valsecchi's attempt to follow him through resulted in contact with Pérez that spun the Addax car and left the Mexican at the back of the field. Valsecchi was later handed a drive-through penalty for his part in the incident. Maldonado piled the pressure on Bianchi until the ART driver ran wide, and then gradually pulled away to secure the win by 8.2s. Bianchi followed him for second and Sam Bird made it an ART 2-3 by finishing third; the Brit having started from 10th on the grid. Giedo van der Garde (Addax) and Dani Clos (Racing Engineering) had an uneventful run to fourth and fifth, while Charles Pic (Arden), Marcus Ericsson (Super Nova) and Michael Herck (DPR) chased each other around to complete the points. It was a particularly welcome result for Ericsson, whose efforts finally helped Super Nova to get its first points of the year. There was one more bit of drama awaiting Pérez when he went to leave the pits and found Coloni's Alberto Valerio pulling out ahead of him with the rear jack still attached. It flew off at turn 4, fortunately bouncing out of Pérez's path and instead wiping out a TV camera mounted on the catch fencing.

Sprint Race
Marcus Ericsson took his first-ever GP2 win in the sprint race in Valencia. The Swede took the lead at the start by beating pole-sitter Michael Herck into the first corner, but faced a determined challenge from Giedo van der Garde over the last two laps. Despite van der Garde's apparent speed advantage, Ericsson did just enough to keep him at bay. While the win was a welcome change of form for the Super Nova team after a tough start to the season, there is also concern within the squad after Ericsson's teammate Josef Kral was taken to hospital following a huge accident on lap three. The Czech driver ran into the back of Arden's Rodolfo González and was launched skyward before landing on his gearbox and slamming into the Turn 17 barriers at high speed. He was taken to Hospital complaining of pain in his back and right arm, but was found to be unharmed seriously. He would return to GP2 at the last round of the season in Abu Dhabi. The accident prompted several laps behind the safety car, which eventually led to the race being flagged several laps before schedule due to time limitations. Herck held on to third, although he needed to shove Pastor Maldonado aside on the run to the finish line in order to do it, while Charles Pic and Davide Valsecchi scored the final points. Sergio Pérez endured another disastrous race; the Mexican being one of several victims of opening lap damage when he was hit by Alberto Valerio. He lost a lap but found himself out of sequence behind the safety car and spent the middle part of the race running fourth on the road ahead of title rival Maldonado. Pérez had just enough time to produce the fastest lap of the race - by a full second - before he was dealt a drive-through penalty for ignoring blue flags.

Classification

Qualifying

Notes
1. - Marcus Ericsson received a ten-place grid penalty because of a collision with Adrian Zaugg in Istanbul.

Feature Race

Sprint Race

Standings after the round

Drivers' Championship standings

Teams' Championship standings

 Note: Only the top five positions are included for both sets of standings.

See also 
 2010 European Grand Prix
 2010 Valencia GP3 Series round

External links
 https://archive.today/20100629223701/http://gp2series.com/Ericsson-powers-to-sprint-race-win.html
 https://archive.today/20100629230949/http://gp2series.com/Maldonado-sails-to-victory-in.html

References

Valencia
Valencia